Orna Kupferman is a Professor of Computer Science and former Vice Rector at the Hebrew University of Jerusalem. She was elected to the Academia Europaea in 2016.

Early life and education 
Kupferman served in the Israel Defense Force from 1986 to 1988. She earned her PhD at the Technion in 1995, where she was supervised by Orna Grumberg. In 1996 Kupferman joined the technical staff at Bell Labs. She moved to University of California, Berkeley in 1997, working with Thomas Henzinger.

Research and career 
In 1998 Kupferman was appointed a Senior Lecturer at the Hebrew University of Jerusalem. She acted as Head of Computer Science from 2005 to 2008, and as Head of Engineering between 2008 and 2011. She was made a Full Professor in 2008. In 2012 Kupferman was awarded a European Research Council grant to study high quality reactive systems. She is developing formal verification and synthesis computer systems for both hardware and software. She uses automata theory approaches to check branching time models.

Kupferman has served as the Advisor on Gender Issues for the President of the Hebrew University of Jerusalem. She has spoken about the challenges achieving gender balance in academia at the Weizmann Institute of Science. She called for the Hebrew University of Jerusalem to end gender segregated education.

Kupferman was elected to the Academia Europaea in 2016. She was also awarded the Hebrew University of Jerusalem Michael Milken Prize for long-standing Excellence in Teaching.

Kupferman has served on the editorial board of Formal Methods in System Design and Logical Methods in Computer Science. She is Editor-in-Chief of ACM Transactions on Computational Logic.

Selected publications

References 

Israeli women computer scientists
Israeli computer scientists
Academic staff of the Hebrew University of Jerusalem
Technion – Israel Institute of Technology alumni
Members of Academia Europaea
20th-century women scientists
21st-century women scientists
Year of birth missing (living people)
Living people